Eumetopiella fascipennis is a species of ulidiid or picture-winged fly in the genus Eumetopiella of the family Ulidiidae.

References

Ulidiinae
Insects described in 1911